Komba Island is a small isolated volcanic island located in Flores Sea, Indonesia. The island is administratively part of Lembata Regency, East Nusa Tenggara. it is located approximately 70 km northeast of Lembata Island. The island contains Mount Batutara, a volcano which erupts in every 20 minutes.

References

Landforms of East Nusa Tenggara